Neurofilament medium polypeptide (NF-M) is a protein that in humans is encoded by the NEFM gene.

Function 

Neurofilaments are type IV intermediate filament heteropolymers composed of light (NEFL), medium (this protein), and heavy (NEFH) chains. Neurofilaments comprise the exoskeleton and functionally maintain neuronal caliber. They may also play a role in intracellular transport to axons and dendrites. This gene encodes the medium neurofilament protein. This protein is commonly used as a biomarker of neuronal damage.

References

Further reading

Human proteins